Nimley Twegbe (born 9 September 1963) is a Liberian long-distance runner. He competed in the marathon at the 1984 Summer Olympics.

References

1963 births
Living people
Athletes (track and field) at the 1984 Summer Olympics
Athletes (track and field) at the 1988 Summer Olympics
Liberian male long-distance runners
Liberian male marathon runners
Olympic athletes of Liberia
Place of birth missing (living people)